Vivi l'internationale, stage name of Victorine Agbato (1946 – 15 February 2022) was a Beninese singer.

Biography
Agbato was known for her songs for peace and love during Benin's transition from communism to democracy. She described it as her contribution to peace in Benin. Active in women's revolutionary organizations, she sang in solidarity with prison detainees in Savalou in 2018. In 2008, she was awarded to the National Order of Benin.

Vivi l'internationale died in Porto-Novo on 15 February 2022.

Discography
Chantent les 20 ans de la loterie nationale du Bénin (1982)
Oluwa Dakun

References

1946 births
2022 deaths
Beninese women singers
People from Porto-Novo